LIVE (All That Remains: Live) is a DVD released by the American metalcore band All That Remains. It was released October 30, 2007. The Philadelphia show was recorded in February 2007, with the Baltimore show being recorded on July 12, 2007.

Track listing

Personnel
Philip Labonte – lead vocals
Oli Herbert – lead guitar
Mike Martin – rhythm guitar
Jeanne Sagan – bass guitar, backing vocals
Jason Costa – drums

References 

2007 live albums
2007 video albums
All That Remains (band) albums
Prosthetic Records live albums
Live video albums